Willie Small may refer to:

recording pseudonym of Steve Lawrence
William Small (Scottish politician)
William Small (disambiguation)